is a Japanese-Ghanaian kickboxer, currently competing in the welterweight division of K-1 and Krush, where he is the current Krush Welterweight champion.

As of March 2022 he was the #8 ranked super featherweight kickboxer in the world by Combat Press.

Kickboxing career

K-1

Early career
Ali made his professional debut against Takuma Shimizu at Krush 104 on August 31, 2019. He won the fight by a third-round knockout. The bout was stopped on the advice of the ringside physician at the 1:04 minute mark, due to a cut above Shimizu's left eyelid. Ali made his second Krush appearance at Krush 107 on November 8, 2019, against Mark Bird James. He won the fight by a third-round knockout, flooring James with a right hook.

Ali left Krush for his next bout, as he was booked to face Takeharu Ogawa at Bigbang the future 26 on August 16, 2020. He won the fight by a third-round head kick knockout.

Ali made his K-1 debut against Kaito at K-1 World GP 2021: K’Festa 4 Day.2 on March 28, 2021. He won the fight by a third-round knockout. Ali first dropped Kaito with a head kick at the 2:00 minute mark of the last round, before finishing him with a right cross thirty seconds later.

Ali was next booked to face the former Krush Welterweight champion Kazuki Yamagiawa in the co-main event of Krush 126 on June 25, 2021. He won the fight by unanimous decision. Two of the judges scored the bout 30–28 in his favor, while the third judge awarded him a 30–29 scorecard.

K-1 Welterweight Grand Prix
On August 18, 2021, it was announced that Ali would participate in the 2021 K-1 Welterweight World Grand Prix, which was held at K-1 World GP 2021: Yokohamatsuri on September 20, 2021. He was booked to face Ruku Kojima in the tournament quarterfinals. He won the fight by unanimous decision, with two judges scoring the bout 30–28, and the third 30–29, in his favor.

Ali advanced to the semifinals, where he faced the 2017 K-1 Japan Grand Prix super lightweight champion, and tournament favorite, Masaaki Noiri. Ali was knocked down early in the opening round with body strikes, and although he was able to rise in time to beat the eight count, he was quickly knocked down for the second time with a left hook to the body. THis resulted in an automatic technical knockout loss for Ali, per the rules of the tournament.

Krush welterweight champion
Ayinta was scheduled to challenge the reigning Krush Welterweight titleholder Riki Matsuoka at Krush 134 on February 20, 2022, in what was Matsuoka's first title defense. The fight was ruled a split decision draw following the first three rounds. Ali was awarded the split decision victory after an extra round was contested, with two judges scoring the bout 10–9 for him, while the third judge awarded the same scorecard to Matsuoka.

Ayinta made his first defense against the one-time Krush Super Lightweight title challenger Kota Nakano at Krush 140 on August 27, 2022. He won the fight by a second-round knockout. Ayinta knocked his opponent down twice, both times with a right straight, once in the first round and once in the second round. Although Nakano was able to beat the eight count both times, he was unsteady on his feet following the second knockdown, which forced the referee to wave the fight off.

Ayinta faced Takumi Sanekata at K-1 World GP 2023: K'Festa 6 on March 12, 2023. He won the fight by unanimous decision, with all three judges awarding him a 30–28 scorecard.

Titles and accomplishments
Professional

Krush
 2022 Krush Welterweight Championship (1 defense)AmateurK-1 2018 K-1 Challenge B-Class -70kg Tournament Winner
 2018 K-1 Challenge B-Class -70kg Tournament Winner
 2019 K-1 Challenge A-Class -70kg Tournament Winner

Kickboxing record

|- style="background:#cfc;"
| 2023-03-12 || Win ||align=left| Takumi Sanekata || K-1 World GP 2023: K'Festa 6 || Tokyo, Japan || Decision (Unanimous)|| 3 ||3:00 
|-  style="background:#cfc;"
| 2022-08-27|| Win || align=left| Kota Nakano || Krush 140 || Tokyo, Japan || KO (punches) || 2 || 0:55
|-
! style=background:white colspan=9 |
|-  style="background:#cfc;"
| 2022-02-20|| Win || align=left| Riki Matsuoka || Krush 134 || Tokyo, Japan || Decision (Split) || 3||3:00
|-
! style=background:white colspan=9 |
|-  style="background:#fbb;"
| 2021-09-20 || Loss || align=left| Masaaki Noiri || K-1 2021: Yokohamatsuri Welterweight World Grand Prix, Semi Final || Yokohama, Japan || TKO (2 Knockdowns) ||1  || 1:32
|-  style="background:#cfc;"
| 2021-09-20 || Win || align=left| Ruku Kojima || K-1 2021: Yokohamatsuri Welterweight World Grand Prix, Quarter Final || Yokohama, Japan || Decision (Unanimous) ||3  ||3:00
|-  style="background:#cfc;"
| 2021-06-25|| Win || align=left| Kazuki Yamagiawa || Krush 126 || Tokyo, Japan || Decision (Unanimous)|| 3 ||3:00
|-  style="background:#cfc;"
| 2021-03-28|| Win ||align=left| Kaito || K-1 World GP 2021: K’Festa 4 Day.2 || Tokyo, Japan || KO (Right Cross) || 3 || 2:30
|-  style="background:#cfc;"
| 2020-08-16|| Win || align=left| Takeharu Ogawa || Bigbang the future 26 || Tokyo, Japan || KO (Knee to the head)|| 3 ||
|-  style="background:#cfc;"
| 2019-11-08|| Win || align=left| Mark Bird James || Krush 107 || Tokyo, Japan || KO (Right Hook) || 3 || 1:35
|-  style="background:#cfc;"
| 2019-08-31|| Win || align=left| Takuma Shimizu || Krush 104 || Tokyo, Japan || TKO (Doctor Stoppage)|| 3 || 1:04
|-
| colspan=9 | Legend:    

|-  style="background:#cfc;"
| 2019-03-24|| Win || align=left| Genki Amemiya || K-1 Amateur Challenge A-class -70kg Tournament, Final || Tokyo, Japan || Decision (Unanimous) || 1 || 2:00
|-
! style=background:white colspan=9 |
|-  style="background:#cfc;"
| 2019-03-24|| Win || align=left| Ken Noda || K-1 Amateur Challenge A-class -70kg Tournament, Semi Final || Tokyo, Japan || KO || 1 ||
|-  style="background:#cfc;"
| 2018-10-14|| Win || align=left| Rikoku Som || K-1 Amateur Challenge B-class -70kg Tournament, Final || Tokyo, Japan ||  Decision (Unanimous) || 1 || 2:00
|-
! style=background:white colspan=9 |
|-  style="background:#cfc;"
| 2018-10-14|| Win || align=left| Daisuke Arakawa || K-1 Amateur Challenge B-class -70kg Tournament, Semi Final || Tokyo, Japan ||  Decision (Unanimous) || 1 || 2:00
|-  style="background:#cfc;"
| 2018-10-14|| Win || align=left| Naoki Kitabayashi || K-1 Amateur Challenge B-class -70kg Tournament, Quarter Final || Tokyo, Japan ||  Decision (Unanimous) || 1 || 2:00
|-  style="background:#cfc;"
| 2018-09-09|| Win || align=left| Katsuhiko Motomiya ||  K-1 Amateur Challenge B-class -70kg Tournament, Final|| Tokyo, Japan ||  Decision || 1 || 2:00
|-
! style=background:white colspan=9 |
|-  style="background:#cfc;"
| 2018-09-09|| Win || align=left| Tomoya Shimamura ||  K-1 Amateur Challenge B-class -70kg Tournament, Semi Final|| Tokyo, Japan ||  Forfeit || ||
|-  style="background:#cfc;"
| 2018-09-09|| Win || align=left| Hiroto Amagi ||  K-1 Amateur Challenge B-class -70kg Tournament, Quarter Final|| Tokyo, Japan ||  Decision || 1 || 2:00
|-  style="background:#cfc;"
| 2018-07-29|| Win || align=left| Kuramoto || K-1 Amateur Challenge B-class || Tokyo, Japan ||  KO ||  ||
|-  style="background:#cfc;"
| 2018-06-10|| Win || align=left| Daisuke Niinuma || K-1 Amateur Challenge C-class || Tokyo, Japan ||  Decision || 2 || 2:00
|-
| colspan=9 | Legend''':

See also
 List of male kickboxers
 List of Krush champions

References

Living people
1999 births
Japanese male kickboxers
Sportspeople from Tokyo